Tango is a ballet made by New York City Ballet balletmaster Peter Martins to Stravinsky's Tango (1940) arranged 1953 by the composer. The premiere took place September 14, 1983 at Tivoli Concert Hall, Copenhagen; the NYCB premiere was in February, 1984.

Original cast 

 Heather Watts
 Bart Cook

Reviews
 NY Times review by Anna Kisselgoff, February 6, 1984

Ballets by Peter Martins
New York City Ballet repertory
1984 ballet premieres
Ballets to the music of Igor Stravinsky